Chaetostoma breve is a species of catfish in the family Loricariidae. It is native to South America, where it occurs in the Zamora River basin, which is part of the Marañon River drainage in Ecuador. The species is large for a loricariid, reaching 30 cm (11.8 inches) in total length.

References 

breve
Fish described in 1904